The Fraternal Hall, at 2nd and Chestnut Sts. in Kimball, Nebraska, was built in 1903–04.  It includes Classical Revival architecture.  It is now operated as Plains Historical Museum.

The building was listed on the National Register of Historic Places in 1983.  It was deemed significant as "the only prototype of an academic architectural style in Kimball County."  It served three fraternal lodge chapters: of Knights of Pythias, of Woodmen, and of Royal Neighbors of America that joined together to create a new building, when the lease they had shared for a previous space was running out.

References

External links 
 Plains Historical Museum - City of Kimball
More photos of the Fraternal Hall at Wikimedia Commons

Neoclassical architecture in Nebraska
Buildings and structures completed in 1904
Museums in Kimball County, Nebraska
Clubhouses on the National Register of Historic Places in Nebraska
History museums in Nebraska
National Register of Historic Places in Kimball County, Nebraska